The Waputik Mountains  are a mountain range of the Canadian Rockies, located on the Continental Divide between Banff and Yoho National Park. Named in 1884 by George M. Dawson, "waputik" is the Stoney Indian word for white goat.

Many of the highest peaks of the range are heavily glaciated as they sit within the Waputik and Wapta Icefields. The range is further divided into the President Range and Waputik Range

This range includes the following mountains and peaks:

See also 
 Ranges of the Canadian Rockies

References

Mountain ranges of Alberta
Mountain ranges of British Columbia
Ranges of the Canadian Rockies
Ranges of the Rocky Mountains
Alberta's Rockies